Prince Arthur, Duke of Connaught and Strathearn (Arthur William Patrick Albert; 1 May 185016 January 1942), was the seventh child and third son of Queen Victoria of the United Kingdom and Prince Albert of Saxe-Coburg and Gotha. He served as Governor General of Canada, the tenth since Canadian Confederation and the only British prince to do so to date.

Arthur was educated by private tutors before entering the Royal Military Academy at Woolwich at 16 years old. Upon graduation, he was commissioned as a lieutenant in the British Army, where he served for some 40 years, seeing service in various parts of the British Empire. During this time he was also created a royal duke, becoming Duke of Connaught and Strathearn as well as Earl of Sussex. In 1900 he was appointed as Commander in Chief of the British Army in Ireland, which he regretted; his preference being to join the campaign against the Boers in South Africa. In 1911, he was appointed as Governor General of Canada, replacing Albert Grey, 4th Earl Grey, as viceroy. He occupied this post until he was succeeded by Victor Cavendish, 9th Duke of Devonshire, in 1916. He acted as the King's, and thus the Canadian Commander-in-Chief's, representative through the first years of the First World War.

After the end of his viceregal tenure, Arthur returned to the United Kingdom and performed various royal duties there and in Ireland, while also again taking up military duties. Though he retired from public life in 1928, he continued to make his presence known in the army well into the Second World War, before his death in 1942. He was Queen Victoria's last surviving son.

Early life

Arthur was born at Buckingham Palace on 1 May 1850, the seventh child and third son of Queen Victoria and Prince Albert of Saxe-Coburg and Gotha. The prince was baptised by the Archbishop of Canterbury, John Bird Sumner, on 22 June in the palace's private chapel.  His godparents were Prince William of Prussia (the later King of Prussia and German Emperor Wilhelm I); his great-uncle's sister-in-law, Princess Bernard of Saxe-Weimar-Eisenach (for whom his maternal grandmother the Duchess of Kent stood proxy); and the Duke of Wellington, with whom he shared his birthday and after whom he was named. As with his older brothers, Arthur received his early education from private tutors. It was reported that he became the Queen's favourite child.

Military career
It was at an early age that Arthur developed an interest in the army, and in 1866 he followed through on his military ambitions by enrolling at the Royal Military College at Woolwich, from where he graduated two years later and was commissioned as a lieutenant in the Corps of Royal Engineers on 18 June 1868. The Prince transferred to the Royal Regiment of Artillery on 2 November 1868 and, on 2 August 1869, to the Rifle Brigade, his father's own regiment, after which he pursued a long and distinguished career as an army officer, including service in South Africa, Canada in 1869, Ireland, Egypt in 1882, and in India from 1886 to 1890.
 
In Canada, Arthur, as an officer with the Montreal detachment of the Rifle Brigade, undertook a year's training and engaged in defending the Dominion from the Fenian Raids; there was initially concern that his personal involvement in Canada's defence might put the Prince in danger from Fenians and their supporters in the United States, but it was decided his military duty came first. Following his arrival at Halifax, Arthur toured the country for eight weeks and made a visit in January 1870 to Washington, D.C., where he met with President Ulysses S. Grant. During his service in Canada he was also entertained by Canadian society; among other activities, he attended an investiture ceremony in Montreal, was a guest at balls and garden parties, and attended the opening of parliament in Ottawa (becoming the first member of the royal family to do so), all of which was documented in photographs that were sent back for the Queen to view. However, Arthur was not just engaged in social and state functions; on 25 May 1870 he was engaged in fending off Fenian invaders during the Battle of Eccles Hill, for which he received the Fenian Medal.

Arthur made an impression on many in Canada. He was given on 1 October 1869 the title Chief of the Six Nations by the Iroquois of the Grand River Reserve in Ontario and the name Kavakoudge (meaning the sun flying from east to west under the guidance of the Great Spirit), enabling him to sit in the tribe's councils and vote on matters of tribe governance. As he became the 51st chief on the council, his appointment broke the centuries-old tradition that there should only be 50 chiefs of the Six Nations. Of the Prince, Lady Lisgar, wife of then Governor General of Canada the Lord Lisgar, noted in a letter to Victoria that Canadians seemed hopeful Prince Arthur would one day return as governor general.

Arthur was promoted to the honorary rank of colonel on 14 June 1871, substantive lieutenant-colonel in 1876, colonel on 29 May 1880 and, on 1 April 13 years later, was made a general. He gained military experience as Commander-in-Chief of the Bombay Army from December 1886 to March 1890. He went on to be General Officer Commanding Southern District, at Portsmouth, from September 1890 to 1893. The Prince had hoped to succeed his first cousin once-removed, the elderly Prince George, Duke of Cambridge, as Commander-in-chief of the British Army, upon the latter's forced retirement in 1895. But this desire was denied to Arthur, and instead he was given, between 1893 and 1898, command of the Aldershot District Command.

He was appointed Colonel-in-Chief of the Rifle Brigade in 1880 and of the 6th (Inniskilling) Dragoons in 1897, and Honorary Colonel of the 3rd (West Kent Militia) Battalion, Queen's Own (Royal West Kent Regiment) in 1884. In August 1899 the 6th Battalion, Rifles of the Canadian Non-Permanent Active Militia, located in Vancouver, British Columbia, asked Prince Arthur to give his name to the regiment and act as its honorary colonel. The regiment had recently been converted to the infantry role from the 2nd Battalion, 5th British Columbia Regiment of Canadian Artillery. With the Prince's agreement the unit was renamed 6th Regiment, Duke of Connaught's Own Rifles (DCORs) on 1 May 1900. He was subsequently appointed colonel-in-chief of the regiment, then known as The British Columbia Regiment (Duke of Connaught's Own), in 1923. He held that appointment until his death.

On 26 June 1902 he was promoted to the post of field marshal, and thereafter served in various important positions, including Commander-in-Chief of Ireland, from January 1900 to 1904, with the dual position of commander of the Third Army Corps from October 1901, and Inspector-General of the Forces, between 1904 and 1907.

Peerage, marriage, and family
On his mother's birthday (24 May) in 1874, Arthur was created a royal peer, being titled as the Duke of Connaught and Strathearn and Earl of Sussex. Some years later, Arthur came into the direct line of succession to the Duchy of Saxe-Coburg and Gotha in Germany, upon the death in 1899 of his nephew, Prince Alfred of Edinburgh, the only son of his elder brother, Prince Alfred, Duke of Edinburgh. He decided, however, to renounce his own and his son's succession rights to the duchy, which then passed to his other nephew, Prince Charles Edward, the posthumous son of Prince Leopold, Duke of Albany.

At St. George's Chapel in Windsor Castle, on 13 March 1879, Arthur married Princess Louise Margaret of Prussia, the daughter of Prince Frederick Charles and a great-niece of the German Emperor, Arthur's godfather, Wilhelm I. The couple had three children: Princess Margaret Victoria Charlotte Augusta Norah (born 15 January 1882 – 1 May 1920), Prince Arthur Frederick Patrick Albert (born 13 January 1883 – 12 September 1938), and Princess Victoria Patricia Helena Elizabeth (born 17 March 1886 – 12 January 1974), who were all raised at the Connaughts' country home, Bagshot Park, in Surrey, and after 1900 at Clarence House, the Connaughts' London residence. Through his children's marriages, Arthur became the father-in-law of Crown Prince Gustaf Adolf of Sweden; Princess Alexandra, Duchess of Fife; and Sir Alexander Ramsay. Arthur's first two children predeceased him; Margaret while pregnant with his sixth grandchild. For many years, Arthur maintained a liaison with Leonie, Lady Leslie, sister of Jennie Churchill, while still remaining devoted to his wife.

Royal duties
Alongside his military career, the Duke continued to undertake royal duties beyond, or only vaguely associated with, the army. He also represented the monarchy throughout the Empire. On the return from a posting in India, he again, this time with his wife, toured Canada in 1890, stopping in all major cities across the country. He also toured Canada in 1906. In January 1903, the Duke and Duchess represented the new King Edward VII at the 1903 Delhi Durbar to celebrate his accession. On their way to India, the couple passed through Egypt where the Duke opened the Assuan dam on 10 December 1902.

In 1910, Arthur travelled aboard the Union-Castle Line ship Balmoral Castle to South Africa, to open the first parliament of the newly formed union, and in Johannesburg on 30 November he laid a commemorative stone at the Rand Regiments Memorial, dedicated to the British soldiers that died during the Second Boer War.

Prince Arthur was a Freemason and was elected as Grand Master of the United Grand Lodge of England when his elder brother was obliged to resign the office upon his accession in 1901 as King Edward VII. He was subsequently re-elected an additional 37 times before 1939, when the Prince was nearly 90 years of age.

Governor General of Canada
It was announced on 6 March 1911 that King George V had, by commission under the royal sign-manual, approved the recommendation of his British prime minister, H.H. Asquith, to appoint Arthur as Governor General of Canada, the representative of the monarch. His brother-in-law, the Duke of Argyll, had previously served as the country's governor general, but when Arthur was sworn in on 13 October 1911 in the salon rouge of the parliament buildings of Quebec, he became the first Governor General who was a member of the British royal family.

To Canada, Arthur brought with him his wife and his youngest daughter, the latter of whom would become an extremely popular figure with Canadians. The Governor General and his viceregal family travelled throughout the country, performing such constitutional and ceremonial tasks as opening parliament in 1911 (for which Arthur wore his field marshal's uniform and the Duchess of Connaught wore the gown she had worn at the King's coronation the previous year) and, in 1917, laying at the newly rebuilt Centre Block on Parliament Hill the same cornerstone his older brother, the late King Edward VII, had set on 1 September 1860, when the original building was under construction. The family crossed the country a number of times and the Governor General made another trip to the United States in 1912, when he met with President William Howard Taft.

When in Ottawa, Connaught maintained a routine of four days each week at his office on Parliament Hill and held small, private receptions for members of all political parties and dignitaries. The Duke learned to ice skate and hosted skating parties at the royal and viceroyal residence Rideau Hall to which the Connaughts made many physical improvements during Arthur's term as governor general. The royal family also took to camping and other outdoor sports, such as hunting and fishing.

In 1914, the First World War broke out, with Canadians called to arms against Germany and Austria-Hungary. Arthur maintained a wider role in the empire for instance, from 1912 until his death, serving as Colonel-in-Chief of the Cape Town Highlanders Regiment but the Connaughts remained in Canada after the beginning of the global conflict, Arthur emphasising the need for military training and readiness for Canadian troops departing for war, and giving his name to Connaught Cup for the Royal North-West Mounted Police, to encourage pistol marksmanship for recruits. He was also active in auxiliary war services and charities and conducted hospital visits. Though well intended, upon the outbreak of the war, Arthur immediately donned his field marshal's uniform and went, without advice or guidance from his ministers, to training grounds and barracks to address the troops and to see them off before their voyage to Europe. This was much to the chagrin of Prime Minister Robert Borden, who saw the Prince as overstepping constitutional conventions. Borden placed blame on the military secretary, Edward Stanton (whom Borden considered to be "mediocre"), but also opined that Arthur "laboured under the handicap of his position as a member of the royal family and never realised his limitations as Governor General." At the same time, the Duchess of Connaught worked for St John Ambulance, the Red Cross, and other organisations to support the war cause. She was also Colonel-in-Chief of the Duchess of Connaught's Own Irish Canadian Rangers battalion, one of the regiments in the Canadian Expeditionary Force, and Princess Patricia also lent her name and support to the raising of a new Canadian army regiment Princess Patricia's Canadian Light Infantry.

His term as Canada's Governor General ended in 1916.

Following the war, Arthur commissioned in memory of Canada's fallen a stained glass window which is located in St. Bartholomew's Church, Ottawa, which the family attended regularly.

Later life

After his years in Canada, the Duke held no similar public offices but undertook a number of public engagements. In 1920, he travelled to South Africa to open Chapman's Peak Drive. The following year he travelled to India, where he officially opened the new Central Legislative Assembly, Council of State, and Chamber of Princes.  During his time in India, the Indian National Congress's first satyagraha was ongoing; as part of this, shops were closed and few Indians attended the official ceremonies when he visited Calcutta in the same year. As president of the Boy Scouts Association and one of Lord Baden-Powell's friends and admirers, he performed the official opening of the 3rd World Scout Jamboree at Arrowe Park.

The Duke also returned to military service and continued well into the Second World War, where he was seen as a grandfather figure by aspiring recruits. The Duchess, who had been ill during their years at Rideau Hall, had died in March 1917, and Arthur mostly withdrew from public life in 1928; his last formal engagement was the opening of the Connaught Gardens in Sidmouth, Devon, on 3 November 1934.

Death
Prince Arthur died on 16 January 1942 at Bagshot Park, at the age of 91 years, 8 months and 16 days, the same age as his elder sister, Princess Louise, Duchess of Argyll, who had died two years and one month before. A funeral service for the Duke was held at St George's Chapel, Windsor Castle on 23 January, after which his body was placed temporarily in the Royal Vault beneath St. George's Chapel in Windsor. He was reburied on 19 March 1942 in the Royal Burial Ground, Frogmore. He was Queen Victoria's last surviving son. His will was sealed in Llandudno after his death in 1942. His estate was valued at £150,677 (or £4.9 million in 2022 when adjusted for inflation).

Titles, styles, honours and arms

As a member of the royal family and having been a viceroy, Prince Arthur held a number of titles and styles during his life. He was also the recipient of many honours, both domestic and foreign. He was an active member of the military, eventually reaching the rank of Field Marshal, and served as personal aide-de-camp to four successive sovereigns.

Arms

Issue

Ancestry

See also

 British prince
 Royal dukedoms in the United Kingdom

Named in his honour:
 Port Arthur, a former city in Northern Ontario
 Connaught, a neighbourhood in Calgary, Alberta, Canada
 Connaught Drive, Singapore
 Connaught Place, New Delhi, the commercial centre of India's capital, the epicentre of the imperial Lutyens' Delhi
 Connaught Place, London, at the south end of Edgware Road, very close to the Marble Arch and Hyde Park
 Connaught Road, Hong Kong, a major thoroughfare on the north shore of Hong Kong Island.
 Connaught Square, Charlottetown, Prince Edward Island
 , a street in Montreal which is partly a pedestrian mall.

Notes

References

External links

 
 
 8 May 1915, newspaper coverage of the Duke of Connaught's appearance at McGill University Convocation.
 Scouting Round the World, John S. Wilson, first edition, Blandford Press 1959 p. 81

|-

|-

1850 births
1942 deaths
19th-century British people
20th-century British people
Connaught and Strathearn
English Anglicans
Arthur, Duke of Connaught and Strathearn
British field marshals
Governors General of Canada
British Army personnel of the Anglo-Egyptian War
Arthur of Connaught and Strathearn, Duke, Prince
House of Windsor
Bailiffs Grand Cross of the Order of St John
Field marshals of the German Empire
Knights Grand Commander of the Order of the Indian Empire
Commanders-in-Chief, Ireland
Knights Grand Commander of the Order of the Star of India
Knights Grand Cross of the Order of St Michael and St George
Great Masters of the Order of the Bath
Knights Grand Cross of the Order of the British Empire
Knights Grand Cross of the Royal Victorian Order
Connaught and Strathearn, Prince Arthur, Duke of
Knights of the Garter
Knights of the Thistle
Knights of the Golden Fleece of Spain
People from Westminster
Members of the Privy Council of the United Kingdom
Grand Masters of the United Grand Lodge of England
Knights of the Order of Charles XIII
Grand Crosses of the Order of Saint Stephen of Hungary
Grand Croix of the Légion d'honneur
Grenadier Guards officers
Rifle Brigade officers
Scots Guards officers
Connaught
Recipients of the Order of the Netherlands Lion
People associated with the Royal National College for the Blind
Members of the Privy Council of Ireland
Burials at the Royal Burial Ground, Frogmore
Chief Scouts of Canada
 Arthur
British princes
Children of Queen Victoria
Princess Patricia's Canadian Light Infantry
Royal reburials
Sons of monarchs
Non-inheriting heirs presumptive